Net2phone provides VoIP and cloud computing-based telephony products and services. The company is a subsidiary of IDT Corporation.

History
Net2Phone was founded in 1990. On July 30, 1999, during the dot-com bubble, the company became a public company via an initial public offering, raising $81 million. Shares rose 77% on the first day of trading to $26 per share. After completion of the IPO, IDT owned 57% of the company. Within a few weeks, the shares increased another 100% in value, to $53 per share.

In March 2000, in a transaction facilitated by IDT CEO Howard Jonas, a consortium of telecommunications companies led by AT&T announced a $1.4 billion investment for a 32% stake in the company, buying shares for $75 each. The transaction was completed in August 2000. AOL had expressed an interest in buying all or part of the company but was not agreeable to the price.

In 2000, the company acquired Aplio, an internet appliance maker located in San Bruno, California.

In August 2000, Jonathan Fram, president of the company, left the company to join eVoice.

In September 2000, the company formed Adir Technologies, a joint venture with Cisco Systems. In March 2002, the company sued Cisco for breach of contract.

In 2001, the company acquired iPing.

In February 2002, the company announced 110 layoffs, or 28% of its workforce.

In October 2004, Liore Alroy became chief executive officer of the company.

On March 13, 2006, IDT Corporation acquired the shares of the company that it did not already own for $2.05 per share.

In January 2017, the company acquired LiveNinja.

References

Communications in New Jersey
Telecommunications companies established in 1990
Companies based in Newark, New Jersey
Dot-com bubble
Instant messaging
VoIP software
Windows instant messaging clients
2000 mergers and acquisitions
2001 mergers and acquisitions
2017 mergers and acquisitions